Şah Sultan ("Sovereign";  1544 – 3 November 1580) was an Ottoman princess, the daughter of Selim II (reign 1566–74) and Nurbanu Sultan. She was the granddaughter of Suleiman the Magnificent (reign 1520–66) and his consort Hurrem Sultan, sister of Sultan Murad III (reign 1574–95) and aunt of Sultan Mehmed III (reign 1595–1603).

Life
Şah Sultan was born in 1544 in Manisa, when her father was still a prince. Her mother was Nurbanu Sultan. She was the elder children of her parents. 

In 1562, strong alliances were made for the daughters of Şehzade Selim, the prince who would succeed Suleiman as Selim II, on 17 August 1562 Ismihan married Sokollu Mehmed Pasha, Gevherhan the admiral Piyale Pasha, and Şah the chief falconer Hasan Agha. The State Treasury covered the expenses for the imperial wedding and granted 15,000 florins as a wedding gift to the imperial son-in-law.

After the death of Hasan Agha in 1574, without child, Şah Sultan married Zal Mahmud Pasha in 1575, apparently a love marriage chose by Şah. This union is said to be a very happy one. They were suited to each another. They had a son and a daughter.

Issue
Şah had a son and a daughter from her second marriage:
Sultanzade Köse Husrev Paşah, who died in war versus the Persians.
Fülane Hanımsultan (1576 - after 1660). She married Abdâl Hân.

Death

Şah Sultan died on 3 November 1580, and was buried in her mosque of her husband, that she and her husband built. It was said that Şah and her husband fell ill at the same time, lay in their deathbeds together, and expired at the same very moment. In reality, he died 12 days after, and was buried with Şah.

References

Sources

1544 births
1577 deaths
16th-century Ottoman princesses